Chesterville is an unincorporated community in Franklin Township in Chester County, Pennsylvania, United States. Chesterville is located at the intersection of Pennsylvania Route 841, Chesterville Road, and North Creek Road.

References

Unincorporated communities in Chester County, Pennsylvania
Unincorporated communities in Pennsylvania